Soldier's Farewell may refer to:

 A Soldier's Farewell, an episode of the British television sitcom Dad's Army
 Soldiers Farewell Hill, a summit in Grand County, New Mexico
 Soldier's Farewell Stage Station, a stagecoach stop in New Mexico